Saint-Germain-de-Fresney (literally Saint-Germain of Fresney) is a commune in the Eure department in Normandy in northern France.

Population

See also
Communes of the Eure department

References

Communes of Eure